Voacanga grandifolia is a plant native to Malesia and Queensland. It is an introduced species in India.

Description 
Voacanga grandifolia grows as a small tree and produces flowers and fruits. It produces milky exudate when cut or damaged similar to many Apocynaceae plants.

Chemical composition
Voacanga alkaloids are predominant alkaloid in this plant which includes Voacangine, Voacamine, Vobtusine. Voacinol is a new and intriguing stereochemically symmetrical bisindole alkaloid present in leaves along with desacetylvindoline.

See also
 Voacanga africana

References

Voacanga
Flora of Malesia
Flora of Queensland